Warwick Hinkel (born 18 June 1981) is a South African cricketer. He played in seventeen first-class and six List A matches for Border from 2001 to 2007.

See also
 List of Border representative cricketers

References

External links
 

1981 births
Living people
South African cricketers
Border cricketers
Cricketers from East London, Eastern Cape